Mansureh-ye Sadat (also Romanized as Manşūreh-ye Sādāt; also known as Manşūreh, Manşūreh-ye Pā’īn, Manşūreh-ye Soflá, and Manūreh-ye Shay) is a village in Hoseyni Rural District, in the Central District of Shadegan County, Khuzestan Province, Iran. At the 2006 census, its population was 551, in 89 families.

References 

Populated places in Shadegan County